Kunihiko Fukushima (Japanese: 福島 邦彦, born 16 March 1936) is a Japanese computer scientist, most noted for his work on artificial neural networks and deep learning. He is currently working part-time as a Senior Research Scientist at the Fuzzy Logic Systems Institute in Fukuoka, Japan.

In 1980, Fukushima published the neocognitron, 
the original deep convolutional neural network (CNN) architecture. Fukushima proposed several supervised and unsupervised learning algorithms to train the parameters of a deep neocognitron such that it could learn internal representations of incoming data. Today, however, the CNN architecture is usually trained through backpropagation. This approach is now heavily used in computer vision.

In 1958, Fukushima received his Bachelor of Engineering in electronics from Kyoto University. He became a Senior Research Scientist at the NHK Science & Technology Research Laboratories. In 1989, he joined the faculty of Osaka University. In 1999, he joined the faculty of the University of Electro-Communications. In 2001, he joined the faculty of Tokyo University of Technology. From 2006 to 2010, he was a visiting professor at Kansai University.

Fukushima acted as founding President of the Japanese Neural Network Society (JNNS). He also was a founding member on the Board of Governors of the International Neural Network Society (INNS), and President of the Asia-Pacific Neural Network Assembly (APNNA).
He was one of the Board of Governors of the International Neural Network Society (INNIS) in 2003.

Awards

In 2020 Fukushima received the Bower Award and Prize for Achievement in Science. He also received the IEICE Achievement Award and Excellent Paper Awards, the IEEE Neural Networks Pioneer Award, the APNNA Outstanding Achievement Award, the JNNS Excellent Paper Award and the INNS Helmholtz Award.

External links
 ResearchMap profile

References

Artificial intelligence researchers
Japanese computer scientists
Living people
Machine learning researchers
Year of birth missing (living people)